Takaya Honda (born 6 September 1987) is an actor and television presenter. He is perhaps best known for his roles as Josh in the children's television series A gURLs wURLd, Klaus Thomson in the comedy series The Family Law and David Tanaka in Neighbours. Honda has also presented episodes of My Great Big Adventure and Play School.

Early and personal life
Honda was born in Canberra, but moved to Sydney when he was young. Both of his parents coached gymnastics. His father, Kazuya Honda, was the coach for the Australia women's national gymnastics team. He attended Barker College and graduated in 2005. The following year he briefly attended UNSW Art & Design, before he transferred to the University of Technology Sydney, where he studied a Bachelor of Arts in communication.

Honda became an ambassador for Dementia Australia in 2017. Honda became engaged to his partner Amy Schwab in May 2019, and they married in November 2020.

Career
Honda was invited to perform with the Sport For Jove Theatre Company by its founding member Damien Ryan. It led to him receiving representation within the acting industry. Honda has appeared on the Australian stage in the company's 2009/2010 and 2010/2011 summer festivals of outdoor Shakespeare; The Sydney Hills Shakespeare in the Park, The Leura Shakespeare Festival and The Sydney Morning Herald Autumn of the Arts Shakespeare in the Gardens. He performed as Puck in A Midsummer Night's Dream, Paris in Romeo and Juliet and Dennis and Forester in As You Like It. In 2012 and 2013 he also appeared in the company's critically acclaimed production of Hamlet.

From 2010, Honda began playing Josh in the children's television series A gURLs wURLd. The series was Honda's first audition and first television role. Honda appeared in an episode of The Code in 2014. He also joined the presenting team of ABC3 series My Great Big Adventure, along with Kayne Tremills, Stephanie Bendixsen and Nancy Denis. The following year, he became a presenter on  Play School, and appeared in the drama film Skin Deep.

In 2016, Honda joined the cast of The Family Law as Klaus Thomson. That same year, he also joined the main cast of long-running soap opera Neighbours as David Tanaka. Honda made his first appearance on 21 September 2016. Alongside Matt Wilson, Honda was part of the first same-sex marriage in an Australian television series since being legalised in Australia in 2017. The wedding episode aired on 3 September 2018.

In December 2022, Honda signed on to star in Joy Hopwood's romantic comedy film The Gift That Gives, alongside Lily Brown-Griffiths, HaiHa Le, and Damien Sato.

Filmography

References

External links

Male actors from Canberra
1987 births
Living people
21st-century Australian male actors
Australian male soap opera actors
Australian television presenters
Australian people of Japanese descent
Australian people of Scandinavian descent
Male actors of Japanese descent